Natali Pronina, also known as Nataliya Aleksandrovna Filina (born 12 August 1987, Baku) is an Azerbaijani Olympic and Paralympic swimmer. She swam for Azerbaijan at the 2004 Summer Olympics, and also in three editions of the World Championships (2003, 2005, and 2009). She also won one gold and four silver medals in the 2012 Summer Paralympics in London, United Kingdom, making her Azerbaijan's most successful athlete for those games. She also represented Azerbaijan at the 2004 Olympic Games in Athens (as Natalya Filina).

Filina qualified for the women's 100 m breaststroke at the 2004 Summer Olympics in Athens, by receiving a Universality place from FINA, in an entry time of 1:19.49. She challenged seven other swimmers in heat one, including Bolivia's Katerine Moreno, who competed at her third Olympics since 1988. She raced to fourth place by nearly a two-second margin behind winner Moreno in 1:20.21. Filina failed to advance into the semifinals, as she placed forty-fourth overall in the preliminaries.

References

External links
 

Paralympic swimmers of Azerbaijan
Swimmers at the 2012 Summer Paralympics
Paralympic gold medalists for Azerbaijan
Paralympic silver medalists for Azerbaijan
1987 births
Living people
Sportspeople from Baku
Azerbaijani people of Russian descent
Medalists at the 2012 Summer Paralympics
S12-classified Paralympic swimmers
Azerbaijani female swimmers
Olympic swimmers of Azerbaijan
Swimmers at the 2004 Summer Olympics
Female breaststroke swimmers
Paralympic medalists in swimming